Matthew Hyland Brennan (born 3 January 1943) is a former Scottish footballer who played as an inside forward.

Career
Brennan began his career at local Glaswegian club St Roch's, before joining Luton Town. Brennan played four times for Luton, scoring once, in the 1962–1963 Second Division, as Luton finished bottom. After departing Luton, Brennan played for non-league clubs Chelmsford City and Cambridge City.

References

1943 births
Living people
Association football forwards
Scottish footballers
Footballers from Glasgow
St Roch's F.C. players
Luton Town F.C. players
Chelmsford City F.C. players
Cambridge City F.C. players
English Football League players
Scottish Junior Football Association players